Mihály Hesz (born 15 December 1943) is a Hungarian sprint canoeist who competed from the early 1960s to the early 1970s. Competing in two Summer Olympics, he won two medals in the K-1 1000 m event with a gold in 1968 and a silver in 1964.

Hesz also won six medals at the ICF Canoe Sprint World Championships with two golds (K-1 10000 m: 1966, K-1 4 x 500 m: 1971), a silver (K-1 4 x 500 m: 1966), and three bronzes (K-1 500 m: 1971, K-1 10000 m: 1963, K-1 4 x 500 m: 1970).

He married and later divorced Andrea Gyarmati, who won two medals in women's swimming at the 1972 Summer Olympics in Munich.

References

External links

1943 births
Canoeists at the 1964 Summer Olympics
Canoeists at the 1968 Summer Olympics
Hungarian male canoeists
Living people
Olympic canoeists of Hungary
Olympic silver medalists for Hungary
Olympic gold medalists for Hungary
Olympic medalists in canoeing
ICF Canoe Sprint World Championships medalists in kayak

Medalists at the 1968 Summer Olympics
Medalists at the 1964 Summer Olympics